Marghi South is a Chadic language of Nigeria. It is perhaps closer to Huba than it is to Margi.

References

Biu-Mandara languages
Languages of Nigeria